The Philippine House Committee on Agriculture and Food, or House Agriculture and Food Committee is a standing committee of the Philippine House of Representatives.

Jurisdiction 
As prescribed by House Rules, the committee's jurisdiction includes the following:
 Agri-economics
 Agribusiness
 Agricultural education including extension services, soil conservation, soil survey and research
 Agricultural research and technology
 Animal industry and quarantine
 Crop and livestock production, insurance, and guarantee programs
 Farm credit and security
 Food and agricultural production
 Irrigation

Members, 18th Congress

Historical members

18th Congress

Members for the Majority 
 Francisco Datol Jr. (SENIOR CITIZENS)
 Nestor Fongwan (Benguet–Lone, PDP–Laban)

See also 
 House of Representatives of the Philippines
 List of Philippine House of Representatives committees
 Department of Agriculture
 Agriculture in the Philippines

Notes

References

External links 
House of Representatives of the Philippines

Agriculture and Food
Agriculture in the Philippines